Poyer is a surname. Notable people with the surname include:

John Poyer (died 1649), Welsh soldier
Jordan Poyer (born 1991), American football player
David Poyer (born 1949), American author and naval officer